Fossil Fighters, known as  in Japan, is a 2008 video game developed by Nintendo SPD, Red Entertainment, M2, and Artdink and published by Nintendo. It was first released in Japan on April 17, 2008 and was later released in North America on August 10, 2009, and in Australia on September 17, 2009.

A sequel titled Super Kasekihoridā, was released in Japan on November 18, 2010. It was released outside Japan originally titled as Super Fossil Fighters, but later changed to Fossil Fighters: Champions, released in North America on November 14, 2011. A Nintendo 3DS entry, Fossil Fighters: Frontier, was released in North America in 2015, but the game has been available in Japan since February 2014.

Gameplay
The central concept of Fossil Fighters is the revival of prehistoric fossils into supernatural forms known as "vivosaurs", charged with elemental energy, and the use of these creatures in combat against each other.

The player accesses regions called "dig sites" and collects "Fossil Rocks", each of which contains one-quarter of a dinosaur's skeleton; head, body, arms, or legs. Fossil Rocks are scanned and cleaned at a "Revival Machine" and then incorporated into a vivosaur. Although a vivosaur can be revived using only a head fossil, integrating the other three parts will grant it bonus strength and access to additional abilities. If the secondary parts are found without a head, they will be stored until the head is found and subsequently integrated into the vivosaur.

Cleaning a Fossil Rock involves removing the rock around the fossil with a hammer, and then the remaining layer of dirt with a drill. The player has 90 seconds to accomplish this task and risks damaging the fossil by hitting it directly with the hammer or drill. A cleaner and less damaged fossil grants more strength to the vivosaur it is integrated into.

Vivosaurs with a head fossil integrated are used in turn-based combat against opposing vivosaurs. Up to three of the player's vivosaurs may challenge up to three of an opponent's. Each team has access to one Attack Zone, two Support Zones and one Escape Zone; their starting positions are in the Attack and Support Zones. Vivosaurs can use attacks and other abilities by expending Fossil Power (FP) gained at the start of each turn. Fossil Power can also be conserved between turns in an attempt to expend a large amount on a strong attack. Two turns’ worth of Fossil Power is added to a combatant's pool if one of their vivosaurs runs out of Life Points (LP) and is defeated. LP also decides who is first to attack in a battle, in which the team with the lowest total LP goes first. The battle is over when all of an opponent's vivosaurs are defeated.

The basic strategy of Fossil Fighters is to use attacks with an Attack Zone vivosaur while Support Zone vivosaurs apply statistical bonuses to the player's Attack Zone or statistical penalties to the enemy's Attack Zone. However, Fossil Fighters contains much strategic diversity. A damaged Attack Zone vivosaur may be "escaped" to the Escape Zone when weakened, but a Support Zone vivosaur must enter the Attack Zone and take its place. The now-empty Support Zone will be filled by the escaped vivosaur in two turns.

Fossil Fighters uses a system of elemental balance where each vivosaur has an elemental affinity. Fire-element vivosaurs gain bonuses against Earth-element vivosaurs, which gain bonuses against Air-type vivosaurs, which gain bonuses against Water-element vivosaurs, which gain bonuses against Fire-element vivosaurs. Neutral-element vivosaurs have no elemental strength or weakness. Certain mythical vivosaurs, only granted to the player in special circumstances, are of the "Legendary" element; these function identically to Neutral-element vivosaurs.

Vivosaur names are generally derived from the name of the creature the vivosaur is based on. For example, Tarbo is a Tarbosaurus, O-Raptor is an Oviraptor, Metria is a Metriacanthosaurus, and Venator is an Afrovenator. Names of vivosaurs can come from either the beginning of the creature's name, (Tarbo from Tarbosaurus, Metria from Metriacanthosaurus) in some cases, the end of it, (Venator from Afrovenator), or in the case of most of the dromaeosaurids and a few others with similar names, have the first letter of their name followed by the similar part of their name (O-Raptor from Oviraptor, F-Raptor from Fukuiraptor, V-Raptor from Velociraptor.)

Plot
The game begins with the Hero on a boat with its captain, Travers. He'll ask a series of questions of which determines the color of the Hero's apparel. Once he arrives at his destination, the Hero visits the local hotel on Vivosaur Island, where the manager gives him instructions on how to work the basic game mechanics. Soon after the manager finishes delivering her instructions, she sends the Hero to a trial Dig Site for first-hand practice. Such practice includes a Fossil Battle against a young boy named Holt. Once he completes the required training, he gains access to his first official Dig Site, the Greenhorn Plains. Upon arriving at said location, a man called Medal-Dealer Joe steals everyone's Dino Medals. The Hero encounters a young girl named Rosie, whose medals have also been stolen (she described the police captain two medals, one of Lambeosaurus, and the other of Edmontosaurus). She informs him that his medals are still safe and that he must fight the criminal in a Fossil Battle. A victory results in Medal-Dealer Joe being arrested, and everyone's Dino Medals being returned safely. Rosie takes interest in the Hero, and decides to accompany him on his journey. Once the duo return to the Island, it is announced that Level-Up Battles have begun. Both Rosie and the Hero successfully complete their battles, bringing them one step closer to becoming a Master.

Soon after they level up, a new Dig Site, known as Knotwood Forest, becomes available. This particular location is home to a tribe called the Digadigs. They plea that the Hero must defend their treasures from the wretched BB Bandits. When investigating the Digadigmid, the Hero encounters a woman by the name of Nevada Montecarlo. The two later team up and take on Vivian, the leader of the BB Bandit Trio. In the meantime, Rosie becomes cursed and is only able to speak in a similar manner to those of the Digadigs. This curse will last throughout the majority of the game. Once the villains flee and peace is restored, Nevada and the Hero, who found a mysterious but tacky idol, part ways. He and Rosie then head back to the Island to compete in their second Level-Up Battle, in which both emerge victoriously.

The Hero then visits the Rivet Ravine site where a Fighter's Seminar is taking place. The fossils will now be seen in different colors depending on the type. A man named McJunker is trying to fix mine carts. The Hero brings him his tools from the BB Bandits and he reveals that Holt is his apprentice. Holt gives the player an Electromonite for McJunker after a battle. After the mine carts are fixed the Hero goes deeper into the cave battles the BB Bandits again, and finds another idol.

After leveling up again, the Hero is now able to visit Bottomsup Bay, with a diving mask. He is tasked with getting a ribbon for a pirate ghost. An eccentric man named Nick Nack has it but he'll only give it for a molted bug shell, a sandal fossil, and dentures of a denture shark in return. The BB bandits try to stop them, but the Hero and Rosie succeed in giving back the ribbon and get yet another idol as a reward. A mysterious girl named Duna appears to be following them.

The next day, Rosie is kidnapped. She is taken to the BB bandits hideout and the Hero is told to bring the three idols he found if he wants Rosie back. After battling Rex, Snivels, and Vivian, the BB Bandits leader is revealed to be Police Chief Bartholomew Bullwort. The Hero succeeds in getting him arrested and saving Rosie. However, Rosie's grandfather, Mr. Richmond, suspects there is something exquisite about the idols and believe the bandits were hired to steal them.

After another level-up tournament, Rosie thanks the Hero for saving him so many times. Dr. Diggins, who has been examining the idols, asks the Hero to go find one more at Mt. Lavaflow. The Hero encounters large lava rocks blocking his path, Duna arrives to get rid of them. After he finds the idol, she demands him to give it to her. Suddenly the lava heat disrupts Duna's "holographic transformation technology" revealing herself to be some sort of dinosaur-like alien. After attempting to attack the player, Duna gets crushed by a lava rock from an earthquake. The Hero saves her by using his digging tools, much to her confusion. After Duna runs off, Rosie meets up with the Hero, but when they return they find that Vivosaur island has been taken over by the BB bandits. Bullwort somehow got his hands on the legendary Vivosaur known as the Frigisaurus. It freezes the Hero and Rosie and they are put in a jail cell. Rex, Snivels, and Vivian help them escape to Diggins as they no longer want to take orders from Bullwort. The Chieftain of the Digadigs reveals that the Frigisaurus was rivals with another legendary Vivosaur known as the Ignosaurus. The Hero, with the help of Rex find the Ignosaurus fossil at Mt. Lavaflow, but Bullwort uses his Imperva-Ray on it making the fossil indestructible. Duna reverses the effects and the Ignosaurus is soon revived, it defeats the Frigisaurus and Bullwort is arrested. After defeating the champion Fossil Fighter, Saurhead, Duna reveals to the Hero that she is a Dinaurian, an alien race that believes humans were a mistake.

The next day, when the Hero and Rosie go to see how her grandfather is doing with the idols, Duna and another Dinaurian named Raptin arrive to take them. They reveal the idols to be Sub-Idolcomps and are going to be used to wipe out the human race. Raptin turns Rosie into a Triconodonta, knocks the Hero out and escapes with Duna. Rosie got Raptin's device that transports people their spaceship, after getting masks from Saurhead, the Hero and Dr. Diggins infiltrate the ship. The two find the Sub-Idolcomps connected to a much larger Idolcomp. Suddenly, the two hide as Duna and the king of the Dinaurians, Dynal, come in. He reveals that their plan is to use the Idolcomp to revert all humans on Earth to amoebas and start over, the plan is called Project: Mother Planet. Dynal tells Duna to press the switch but she refuses, she has come to accept that humans and just as intelligent as Dinaurians. Dynal is furious that she wants the plan shut down as he doesn't see it the same way, so he goes to do it himself but the Hero jumps in his way and battles him. Despite losing, Dynal manages to press the switch on the main Idolcomp. But Diggins manages to disconnect a Sub-Idolcomp so it wouldn't work. It also ends up sending him back in time to the Jurassic period, but the Sub-Idolcomp was with him. King Dynal attempts to kill the Hero and Duna but the two teleport to safety.

Duna reveals to Mr. Richmond that the plan of Project: Mother Planet is to recreate the Dinaurian home planet. After it was destroyed by the giant planet devourer, Guhnash, the Dinaurians searched space for a new home. When they found Earth, they used their DNA to create seeds to plant on the planet. However, the seeds took a different evolutionary path: humans. The Idolcomp was created to monitor the evolutions and regress humans back to amoebas so they can evolve into Dinaurians, but the Sub-Idolcomps got lost in an accident and ended up on Vivosaur Island. They didn't know about human society so they hired the BB Bandits to look for them. They all agree they have to find the Sub-Idolcomp before King Dynal. Rosie is back to normal as the portable regression ray Raptin had was weak, but excitement still triggers the effects. The Sub-Idolcomp got shattered into five fragments while traveling through time, after gathering them all Duna reveals that it's still missing its core processor. Mr. Richmond remembers a secret island that the spaceship was found on, the technologies found inside were used to revive fossils. Richmond and Diggins hid the Secret Island away to prevent the technology from falling into the wrong hands. When the Hero and Duna enter the dinaurian starship, the latter finds out that the scout ship on the first exhibition to Earth was attacked by Guhnash. In the main control room is a human with the last idol fragment in stone-sleep. Suddenly, Raptin appears and attacks the Hero to get the fragment, but the latter manages to win the battle causing Raptin to leave. The two revive Dr. Diggins back in the Fossil Center, he found the stone-sleep technology in the old ship. Returning to the Richmond building Mr. Richmond has Rosie and the Hero assemble the Sub-Idolcomp to make sure it's real, but he's actually King Dynal. He stuns all of the Hero's friends causing the latter to chase him. Back on the spaceship, the Hero suggests that the humans and Dinaurians could live on the planet together. Although Dynal considers it, Raptin, still seeing humans as their mistake, was against the idea and presses the switch, but then the Sub-Idolcomps suddenly speak. They reveal that the seeds the Dinaurians planted actually perished in the ocean and that humans originated from their own planet. They agreed to just watch them grow but the main Idolcomp wanted to destroy them, so it sent broadcast signals to Guhnash who didn't have the coordinates of Earth until the Sub-Idolcomps were returned. Upon returning to Earth, Diggins reveals that he found a sample of the monster when he went back in time, Guhnash can only be defeated by taking out its three brains. Dynal sets the teleporter to the mouth of Guhnash, it can only send one additional person for support, the Hero has the option to bring either Rosie or Duna. The two are successful in saving Earth, but the teleporter got interfered by the leaking of energy from Guhnash who is about to explode. The two use a portable stone-sleep inducer to turn them both to stone in order to protect themselves and head back to Earth. As soon he gets back, the Hero is revived but the girl he took with him met with a more unfortunate fate: if Duna was chosen her petrified state couldn't be reversed and if Rosie was chosen she lost her memories. Either way, the chieftain of the Digadig Tribe comes to help, he tells the Hero to perform a hip-shaker dance which restores the girl back to normal.

During the credits, the player sees what all the characters in the game are doing now. Afterwards, the Hero can take part in a series of side quests, where one includes helping Dr. Diggins build and use a time machine.

Characters
Hero (known in the official manga as Hunter): The protagonist of the game. A young boy that arrives on Vivosaur Island at the start of the game. Players can change the character's name and the colors of his outfit, but not his gender. Players also can change his face by finding or purchasing masks later in the game.
Rosie Richmond: A young girl with pink pigtails, matching pink skirt, and a matching pink helmet. Rosie helps the player character at various times but seems to have bad luck. She is also one of the love interests for the hero.
Holt: McJunker's apprentice and another Fossil Fighter. In the official manga, Holt is a big fan of V-Raptors and Rosie also has a crush on him.
Dr. Diggins: A tall, wiry man with glasses, blue hair, and a deep tan. The foremost scientist on Vivosaur Island, and an expert at cleaning and reviving vivosaurs.
The B.B. Bandits: An organization of thieves on the island. The player encounters and battles three of the members several times: Vivian, the greenish blue-haired field leader, her long-nosed subordinate Snivels, and their strange canine companion Rex.
The Digadig Tribe: A tribe of ancient island natives, led by a chieftain.
Captain Woolbeard: A ghost pirate who lives in a shipwreck in Bottomsup Bay. He wears a pink ribbon on his beard.
Saurhead: The reigning arena champion, a mountain of a man with a macho attitude and trademark green dinosaur mask, making him seem much like a luchador wrestler.
Duna: A mysterious girl (Dinaurian) with purple hair, and a deep connection to the island's past. She is also a love interest for the hero.
Raptin: Dinaurian elite (like Duna) with blue hair, and the character to go against Dynal's word to remove humans from earth.
Mr. Richmond: Rosie's Grandfather who owns Vivosaur Island. He appears frequently throughout the plot and has his own office in the Richmond Building.
King Dynal: The leader of the Dinaurians and the main antagonist during the second arc.
Guhnash: A large monster with three brains, he roams the universe for planets of life to eat whole. The Hero fights him in order to save Vivosaur Island and the Earth itself.

Development
The director Azusa Tajima and Genki Yokota from Nintendo SPD along with their entire sound staff from Nintendo worked together with Artdink, M2 and Red Entertainment in the development of this game. In an interview with the 4-team development group, Nintendo's Hitoshi Yamagami describes the game's conception around 2004, when Red Entertainment proposed the idea of a game involving dinosaurs.

Manga
The official manga currently has 15 "episodes" as stated on the Fossil Fighters official website, each of which has 16 pages.

Hunter, the main character of the manga has revived the following vivosaurs:

Spinax (Altispinax): Hunter's first revived vivosaur
V-Raptor (Velociraptor): Hunter's 2nd revived vivosaur
Krona (Kronosaurus): Hunter's 3rd revived vivosaur
Shoni (Shonisaurus): A slow developer, but fends off the BB Bandits' Plesio (Plesiosaurus) in the manga.
Tricera (Triceratops): Revived from Greenhorn Plains, Tricera was used against BB bosses Frigi, but didn't stand a chance. Also fought alongside the Samurai's Mihu (Mihunekisaurus), in destroying the Dinomaton in Fossil Stadium.
Coatlus (Quetzalcoatlus): Not seen being used in battle, but has assisted Hunter.
Igno: Battled the BB Boss' Frigi, though only temporarily as Igno faded after Frigi was beaten

Reception
Fossil Fighters received a score of 32 out of 40 by the Japanese magazine Famitsu. The game was the third best-selling game in Japan the week of its release at 35,000 copies sold. By the end of 2008, Fossil Fighters had sold 240,176 copies, making it the 15th best-selling DS game of the year in the region. In the United States, it sold 92,000 units in August 2009, making it the 10th best selling game for that month.

In America, Fossil Fighters scores averaged between 7 and 8. Reviewers generally praised the game for being fun, having simple yet surprisingly addictive cleaning while having battles that were somewhat enjoyable. While most reviewers compared it to the Pokémon video game series, some reviewers like GameSpot didn't mind, saying that they might as well borrow from the best, while others didn't bring it up much. Reviewers found game elements like graphics and music overall lacking, and some reviewers, like IGN (who gave the game a 5.3), knocked the game for being repetitive and too Pokémon-like.

Notes

References

External links
 Official website  
 Official website 
 DS Fanboy article

2008 video games
Artdink games
Dinosaurs in video games
Fossil Fighters
Multiplayer and single-player video games
Nintendo DS games
Nintendo DS-only games
Red Entertainment games
Role-playing video games
Video games developed in Japan
Video games set on fictional islands